Destrehan Plantation is an antebellum mansion, in the French Colonial style, modified with Greek Revival architectural elements. It is located in southeast Louisiana, near the town of the same name, Destrehan.

During the 19th century, the plantation was a major producer of indigo and then sugarcane.  The home is most commonly associated with its second owner, Jean-Noël Destréhan, who served briefly as the first United States Senator from Louisiana in 1812. He was influential in the transition of the Orleans Territory to statehood.

The house is a unique example of a plantation home outliving the oil refinery that had been built around it.  It is listed on the National Register of Historic Places for its architectural quality and association with important people and events in Louisiana history.

History

Robert Antoine Robin de Logny (  -1792)
One of the oldest homes in Louisiana, Destrehan Plantation was constructed beginning in 1787 and completed in 1790, during the period of Spanish rule. Robert Antoine Robin de Logny contracted with Charles Pacquet, a mulatto carpenter, to build a raised house in the West Indies or Creole style, with outbuildings to support his indigo plantation.  Pacquet was given the use of six slaves to construct the home.  When the work was completed, Charles Pacquet received the following remuneration: "one brute negro," a cow and a calf, 100 bushels each of corn and rice, and $100 in cash. The building contract, still on file at the St. Charles Parish courthouse in Hahnville, makes the Destrehan Plantation house the oldest documented house in the lower Mississippi River Valley.

Jean-Noël Destréhan (1754–1823)

Upon Robin de Logny's death in December 1792, the plantation was purchased at auction by his son-in-law, Jean Noël Destréhan, who had married Marie-Claude Céleste Eléonore Robin de Logny (1770–1824), in 1786. The Destréhans had a total of 14 children, which required the addition of two semi-detached wings, or garçonnières, for their sons and the enclosure of the ground floor.

In the 1790s due to crop failures and indigo blight, Destréhan began cultivating sugarcane, after his brother-in-law, Étienne de Boré, perfected the granulation of sugar to make it a profitable cash crop. Destrehan Plantation became the leading sugar producer in St. Charles Parish in 1803.

After the Louisiana Purchase, when the former colony had become a U.S. territory, the Destrehan Plantation was involved in a major slave revolt, the 1811 German Coast Uprising. Jean-Noël Destrehan was appointed to the parish tribunal by Judge Pierre Bauchet St. Martin, as one of five or six men who were to interrogate the accused rebels.

Three swift trials were conducted, one in St. John the Baptist Parish, one at Destrehan Plantation (St. Charles Parish), and the third in New Orleans (Orleans Parish). Local justice was yet based on the traditional French system, which did not provide for a fair and impartial trial or an opportunity for appeal of a court's ruling. (In addition, the judges were slave owners.)

The Destrehan tribunal resulted in the immediate execution of eighteen rebels (reportedly by firing squad), including at three of Jean-Noël's former slaves.

Stephen Henderson (1773–1838)
Ownership changed again after Jean-Noël Destréhan's death in 1823. Two years later, his son-in-law Stephen Henderson bought the plantation from the estate. Henderson was an immigrant from Scotland, who had arrived in the United States penniless but became an extremely wealthy entrepreneur. In 1816, he had married Marie Eléonore "Zelia" Destréhan, who was 16 years old at the time of her marriage; Henderson was 42. Destrehan Plantation was Zelia's childhood home. Zelia died in 1830, childless; and a grief-stricken Henderson died eight years later.

Henderson's will was quite controversial in its time, as it stipulated that all his slaves be freed; and for those that desired, they would be given transport to Liberia. For those who stayed, a factory was to be set up for the freed slaves to manufacture shoes and clothes, and 25 years after his death a city was to be laid out on the grounds of the plantation and named Dunblane. The family contested the will; and after 12 years in litigation and an appeal to the Louisiana Supreme Court, the will was set aside based on a legal technicality.

Pierre Adolphe Rost (1797–1868)
Pierre Adolphe Rost, a justice of the Louisiana Supreme Court from 1845 to 1853, purchased the plantation from the Henderson estate in 1839. He and his wife, Louise Odile Destréhan, another daughter of Jean-Noël Destréhan, began to remodel the house in the then-popular Greek Revival style. Doors and windows were trimmed in Greek Revival details, the wood columns of the façade were encased in plastered brick, and the rear gallery was enclosed to create an entrance foyer.  Also, removed from the rear gallery, winding staircases were re-installed in the center hall; and on the exterior, the stucco was scored to resemble stone.

Upon the advent of the American Civil War, Rost offered his services to the Confederate States of America and was assigned as the C.S.A.'s diplomatic representative in Spain, where he stayed with his family for most of the war. After the Civil War ended in 1865, the plantation was seized by the Freedmen's Bureau, and the Rost Home Colony was established. The plan was for the freedmen to have access to medical and educational aid, in addition to working for wages or for a portion of the harvested crops. The Rost Home Colony was the most successful of those created in Louisiana and provided a profit to the Bureau.

Also in 1865, Pierre Rost returned from Europe, with a pardon from President Andrew Johnson, and demanded his property back. The Colony existed for an additional year, paying Rost rent, with the last colonist departing in December 1866.

Pierre Rost died in 1868 and his wife and son, Emile Rost, continued to live at Destrehan Plantation. Emile Rost sold the plantation in 1910, to the Destrehan Planting and Manufacturing Company, ending family ownership of the estate after 123 years.

American Oil Company
In 1914, the Mexican Petroleum Company, a predecessor of the American Oil Company, bought the property and built an oil refinery. The company tore down the ancillary buildings around the manor house and built employee housing. The mansion itself was used in a variety of ways including as a clubhouse. In 1959, American Oil tore down the refinery, abandoning the site; the following 12 years brought rapid decay for Destrehan Plantation house.

Due in part to an old legend that the privateer Jean Lafitte had hidden treasure in the house, treasure-seekers left gaping holes in the walls. Vandals also stripped the building of its Italian-marble mantels, cypress paneling, Spanish-style ceramic tiles, and glass window panes.  Fortunately, a local sheriff prevented the theft of the plantation's original 1840s iron entrance gates and a  marble bathtub, rumored to be a gift from Napoleon Bonaparte to the family.

River Road Historical Society
The oil company continued its support in 1990 by donating monies for the installation of a fire sprinkler system and new roof, as well as gifting an additional  of surrounding land.

Through its volunteer efforts, the historical society was able to raise sufficient funds to halt the process of decay at the former plantation, restoring the house and grounds to their former beauty. Recent efforts have focused on authentically re-creating the plantation community which would have surrounded the manor house.

Destrehan Plantation is open daily for guided tours, which interpret the lives of the plantation's former residents — both free and enslaved. Period crafts such as dyeing with indigo, candle-making, and open-hearth cooking are demonstrated on most days.

Destrehan Plantation in popular culture
Destrehan Plantation was used as a location in the following feature films and television shows:

Feature films
 12 Years a Slave (2013)
 Interview with the Vampire (1994)
  Lemonade - Portions of Beyoncé's film were recorded at Destrehan Plantation (2016)

Television shows
 Flip My Food with Chef Jeff (2015)
 NCIS: New Orleans (2015)
 Ravenswood (2013)

Source:

See also
1811 German Coast Uprising
History of Louisiana
History of slavery in Louisiana
List of plantations in Louisiana
List of the oldest buildings in Louisiana
National Register of Historic Places listings in St. Charles Parish, Louisiana
National Register of Historic Places listings in Louisiana
Slavery in the colonial United States
Slavery in the United States

References

External links

Louisiana State Museum Map Database, Destrehan Plantation
Freedmen's Bureau, LA - Rost Home Colony

Houses on the National Register of Historic Places in Louisiana
National Register of Historic Places in St. Charles Parish, Louisiana
Plantation houses in Louisiana
Sugar plantations in Louisiana
Historic house museums in Louisiana
Houses in St. Charles Parish, Louisiana
Museums in St. Charles Parish, Louisiana
French colonial architecture
Greek Revival houses in Louisiana
Antebellum architecture
Farms on the National Register of Historic Places in Louisiana
Tourist attractions in St. Charles Parish, Louisiana
Colonial architecture in Louisiana
Amoco
Houses completed in 1790
1790 establishments in the Spanish Empire